The Dinner Party Stakes is an American Thoroughbred horse race held annually in mid-May at Pimlico Race Course in Baltimore, Maryland. It is the eighth-oldest graded stakes race in the United States and the oldest stakes race in Maryland and all of the Mid-Atlantic states. The race is open to horses age three and up and is run one and one-eighth miles on the turf. Currently a Grade II stakes race with a purse of $250,000, at one time the Dixie was a very important race that drew the top horses from across North America.

History
First run as the "Dinner Party Stakes" when Pimlico Race Course opened in 1870, it was named for the 1868 dinner party in Saratoga Springs, New York where Maryland Governor Oden Bowie and others met and wagered, resulting in the building of the Pimlico race course for thoroughbred race horses.

The inaugural event was won by Preakness, for whom the Preakness Stakes was named. In 1871, it was called the Reunion Stakes and was won in a walkover by Harry Bassett. Suspended in 1888, in 1924, the race was revived by William P. Riggs, Maryland Jockey Club secretary.

Modern era
Champions of many eras are among the Dixie's winners. Ten winners or runners-up have won the Eclipse Award or Champion, the latest being Paradise Creek in 1994. Other Dixie Stakes Champions include Sky Classic (1992), Bowl Game (1978), Fort Marcy (1970), Turbo Jet II (1964), Assault (1947), Armed (1946), Whirlaway (1942), Sarazen (1925), Duke of Magenta (1878), and Tom Ochiltree (1875).

The winner of the Dixie Stakes is presented with one of the most revered trophies in American thoroughbred horseracing, a replica of the oldest trophy in North America, the Annapolis Subscription Plate. That replica, "The Dungannon Bowl", is a perpetual trophy given annually to the winner of the Dixie Stakes, the oldest stakes race run in Maryland and the Mid-Atlantic states.

Run for many years as the Dixie Handicap, in 1965 it was raced in two divisions at a mile and a half. Or et Argent won the first division in a course record time of 2:30.20. A few minutes later, Flag won the second division, beating Or et Argent's record with a clocking of 2:29.00.

The 2018 edition of the race was run on dirt due to a heavy front of rain over Pimlico, and was downgraded to a Gr.III for the running. Fire Away, a half-brother to stallion Mr. Speaker, won the race.

Records 

Most wins:
 2 – Sarazen (1925, 1926)

Speed record: 
  mile : 1:40.57 – Ironicus  (2015)
  mile : 1:46.34 – Mr. O'Brien (2004)
  miles : 2:27.80 – Nassipour (1985)

Most wins by an owner:
 5 – Calumet Farm (1937, 1942, 1944, 1946, 2013)
 3 – Sam-Son Farm (1992, 2000, 2002)

Most wins by a jockey:
 5 – Ramon Domínguez (2003, 2004, 2006, 2007, 2010)
 4 – Pat Day (1991, 1992, 1994, 1999)
 4 – Vincent Bracciale Jr. (1973, 1976, 1983, 1985)

Most wins by a trainer:
 4 – Wyndham Walden (1875, 1878, 1879, 1880)
 4 – Ben A. Jones (1937, 1942, 1944, 1946)
 3 – Max Hirsch (1925, 1926, 1947)
 3 – William I. Mott (1994, 1998, 2001)

Winners of the Dinner Party Stakes since 1870 

A # designates that the race was run in two divisions in 1965.  
** In 1971 Fort Marcy finished first but was disqualified and placed fourth.
A @ indicates that this race was run at Laurel Park Racecourse from 1915 to 1919 as the Dixie Handicap.

See also 

 Dinner Party Stakes top three finishers
 Preakness Stakes
 Black-Eyed Susan Stakes 
 Pimlico Race Course
 List of graded stakes at Pimlico Race Course

Laurel Parks's Dixie Handicap 
From 1915 through 1918, Laurel Park Racecourse hosted a Dixie Handicap. The winners were:
1918 – Cudgel 
1917 – Ticket 
1916 – Short Grass 
1915 – The Finn

References 

 The 2008 Dixie Stakes at the NTRA
 October 24, 1877 New York Times report on the Dixie Stakes with list of past winners

Graded stakes races in the United States
Open mile category horse races
Turf races in the United States
Pimlico Race Course
Horse races in Maryland
Recurring sporting events established in 1870
1870 establishments in Maryland